Kairine is a derivative of tetrahydroquinoline which was first described by Wilhelm Fischer in 1883. Its name comes from the Greek kairos, meaning "the right time". It is an antipyretic, formerly used against typhoid fever, but now largely obsolete due to severe side effects. Both kairine and its N-ethyl homolog show similar antipyretic activity.

See also
 8-Hydroxyquinoline

References

Nitrogen heterocycles
Antipyretics